"Nothing Good Happens After 2 A.M." is the 18th episode in the first season of the television series How I Met Your Mother. It originally aired on April 10, 2006.

Plot 
Future Ted tells his children of a saying his mother used and which he agrees with: "Nothing good ever happens after 2 a.m." He then picks up his narrative from where the previous episode left off, having just returned home from a karaoke club and receiving a call from Robin.

Earlier that day, Robin does a presentation on her career with Lily's class but gets defensive when the children ask about her romantic life instead. Robin's feelings of loneliness are amplified when her co-anchor, Sandy Rivers (Alexis Denisof), tells her that they should have sex. When she returns home, she drinks a large glass of wine and calls Ted, who has been waiting for a phone call from Victoria. Ted believes the phone call will be about breaking up, but Victoria does not call when expected and Ted is left feeling anxious. When Robin's phone call comes, he agrees to go to her apartment, but his attempts to rationalize his decision are undermined when he begins conversing with his conscience, which appears personified as Victoria. When Ted consults Marshall and Lily, they both attempt to dissuade him, but Lily unwittingly encourages him when she says that Robin has feelings for Ted.

When Ted arrives at Robin's apartment, he lies about breaking up with Victoria and they begin kissing. Ted goes to the bathroom, to think about his situation. Just when he convinces himself that it is all right to have sex with Robin, he realizes he has Robin's phone. He emerges from the bathroom just as an upset Robin is getting off his phone with Victoria (thinking it was hers), who has called at last. Robin tosses Ted's phone back at him, and tells him to call her back (subtly advising Ted to leave). As Ted heads back to his apartment, he calls Victoria and the two break up. Future Ted reminds his kids that nothing good happens after 2 a.m., and says that lying to Robin was the stupidest thing he ever did.

Meanwhile, Barney attempts to prove to Lily and Marshall that good things can happen after 2 a.m. when they try to leave a karaoke bar early. Barney invites a Korean Elvis impersonator to come with the group to MacLaren's. When Korean Elvis tries to convince them to stay, he whispers something in Lily's ear, which causes her to knee him in the groin. Future Ted claims that Barney was right and that the night was "legendary".

Critical response
The TV Critic rated the episode 66 out of 100, describing the episode as "a very traditional mid season will they-won’t they romance story", but stating that it was "effective nonetheless".

References

External links
 

How I Met Your Mother (season 1) episodes
2006 American television episodes